Conotelus mexicanus is a species of sap-feeding beetle in the family Nitidulidae. It is found in Central America, North America, and Oceania.

References

Further reading

 

Nitidulidae
Articles created by Qbugbot
Beetles described in 1864